The Mixed team normal hill competition at the FIS Nordic World Ski Championships 2023 was held on 26 February 2023.

Results
The first round was started at 17:00 and the final round at 18:35.

References

Mixed team normal hill